The Svenskt konstnärslexikon is a dictionary of Swedish art and artists that was published in five volumes by Allhems Förlag AB from 1952 to 1967. The dictionary includes over 12,000 biographical entries for Swedish artists with detailed bibliographies for each entry. The editors were Gösta Lilja, Bror Olsson, Knut Andersson and S. Artur Svensson, with additional contributions by Johnny Roosval, Ragnar Josephson and Karl Erik Steneberg.

References 

Swedish dictionaries
Swedish art
1952 non-fiction books